Asociația Sport Club Daco-Getica București, commonly known as Daco-Getica București, is a Romanian professional football club based in Bucharest.

From 1992 to the summer of 2018, the team was known as Juventus București, a name which was also used by unrelated Petrolul Ploiești in the past. One year prior to the renaming, Daco-Getica played their first season in the Liga I, the top division in the country.

Daco-Getica dissolved its senior squad after 13 rounds played of the 2019–20 Liga II season.

History

Thus, under the ownership of Ilie Ciuclea, in 1992 was founded Juventus Colentina București, club that had officially no legacy with the old Juventus, but was founded to become a football school which would act as a launch pad for young talents. It was enrolled in the Liga III on the place of Calculatorul București, the old club of Colentina neighbourhood, which disappeared from the stage of the Romanian football system, by this maneuver. Action "Juventus, 1992" has proposed an attempt to follow in the footsteps of the founder of the original Juventus, Ettore Brunelli, to honour his memory and highlight his merits. It was clear that Brunelli was no longer alive, considering that ought to be 110 years old (he was born in Messina on 8 April 1882). Ciuclea searched for potential descendants or heirs in an attempt to offer a symbolic continuation of the old club's tradition. There were intense correspondences between SC Supercom SA by general manager Ilie Ciuclea, the Italian Red Cross and the Italian Embassy in Bucharest, the final result of all efforts was expressed in the answer given on 20 October 2000 by the Italian Embassy in Bucharest which said:

"Evidence from the archive that Mr Ettore Brunelli had two sons, Enrico and Giuliana, born in Genoa on 4 September 1909, respectively, on 24 December 1915. Unfortunately, although your initiative is laudable, it is unable to check if two people are still alive."

It is likely that Ettore Brunelli, with his two sons, have left the country after nationalizing it in 1948, probably the evidence was lost in the political conditions of the time.

After the refoundation Juventus played mostly at Liga III and promoted in the Liga II for the first time in its history at the end of the 2009–10 season. In the Liga II Juventus made two weak seasons, in the first one finished 16th, the last one of the 1st series, but was saved by relegation due to lack of teams. For the second season the club was moved in the 2nd series, but relegated again, this time occupying the 14th place.

Rise to the Liga I (2015–2018)

After winning the second series of Liga III, at the end of the 2015–16 season, the club promoted back to Liga II, after a hiatus of 4 years. Next year, Romanian Football Federation changed Liga II's system from the one with two series to a league with only one series of 20 teams, after one year since promoting from Liga III, Juventus managed to win the league and thus promoting for the first time ever in the Liga I, by becoming the first ever single winner of Liga II.

Liga I it turned out to be "a nut too hard to break" for "The Old Lady from Colentina" and after finishing the regular season only on the 14th place (the last one), with only 11 points, the team made a slightly better play out, but insufficient to save from relegation, finishing 14th with only 17 points, 10 points away from 13th place and 13 points away from a safe place.

Daco-Getica (2018–present)
After relegating from Liga I at the end of their first season in the top flight of the Romanian football, the club was forced to change its name after being summoned by Juventus Torino to remove the word "Juventus". Thus, from the summer of 2018 the side is known as ASC Daco-Getica București, a reference to the Daco-Getae people belonging to the Thracian branch, who lived on the territory of Romania in the past and are the precursors of the Romanian people.

Honours

Domestic

Leagues
Liga II 
Winners (1): 2016–17
Liga III
Winners (2): 2009–10, 2015–16
Runners-up (5): 1998–99, 2001–02, 2006–07, 2007–08, 2014–15

League history

References

External links
 
 Club profile on UEFA's official website
 Club profile on LPF's official website

 
Association football clubs established in 1992
Football clubs in Bucharest
Liga I clubs
Liga II clubs
Liga III clubs
1992 establishments in Romania